The Frederic Depot is a historic railroad station located at 210 Oak St. W in Frederic, Wisconsin. The station was built in 1901 for the Minneapolis, St. Paul and Sault Ste. Marie Railroad. It was constructed at the Soo Line shops in Minneapolis and shipped to Frederic by rail, where it was assembled.  The depot was added to the National Register of Historic Places in 2000.

Passenger service to Frederic ended on June 25, 1961, when trains 62 and 63 between the Twin Cities and Duluth were discontinued.

References

Railway stations on the National Register of Historic Places in Wisconsin
Railway stations in the United States opened in 1901
Former Soo Line stations
National Register of Historic Places in Polk County, Wisconsin
Former railway stations in Wisconsin
Railway stations closed in 1961